"Ain't No Way Around It" may refer to:

"Ain't No Way Around It", a 1986 song by Charley Pride from The Best There Is

"Ain't No Way Around It", a 2011 song by DJ Drama from Third Power
"Ain't No Way Around It", a 1989 song by Faster Pussycat from Wake Me When It's Over